Kara Aline Hanlon (born 4 June 1997) is a Scottish international swimmer. She has represented Scotland at the Commonwealth Games.

Biography
Hanlon educated at the University of Edinburgh won three gold medals at the 2020 British Universities and Colleges Sport Championships. She won three medals including the gold medal in the 100 metres breaststroke event, at the 2022 British Swimming Championships. 

After just missing selection in 2014 she gained selection for the 2022 Commonwealth Games in Birmingham where she competed in two events; the women's 50 metres breaststroke, finishing in 6th place and the women's 100 metres breaststroke, finishing in 7th place.

References

1997 births
Living people
Scottish female swimmers
British female swimmers
Swimmers at the 2022 Commonwealth Games
Commonwealth Games competitors for Scotland
20th-century Scottish women
21st-century Scottish women